Cyperus heterocladus is a species of sedge that is native to central parts of Madagascar.

See also 
 List of Cyperus species

References 

heterocladus
Plants described in 1883
Endemic flora of Madagascar
Taxa named by John Gilbert Baker